Etemaad Daily is an Urdu newspaper based in Hyderabad, India.  It was established in the year 2002 and is owned by a local political party All India Majlis-e-Ittehadul Muslimeen. Its editor is Burhanuddin Owaisi, son of Sultan Salahuddin Owaisi who was the president of All India Majlis-e-Ittehadul Muslimeen. Etemaad Daily is located in the Darrussalam area of Hyderabad. It is the largest selling Urdu newspaper in Hyderabad and local Cities.

References

External links
  Etemaad Daily
 Etemaad English Online

Daily newspapers published in India
Newspapers published in Hyderabad
Urdu-language newspapers published in India
Publications established in 2002
2002 establishments in Andhra Pradesh